Saadani Mint Khaytour is a deputy in the government of Mauritania. Khaytour is a member of the parliament of Mauritania.

References

Living people
Members of the Mauritanian Parliament
Year of birth missing (living people)